Orchidophilus is a genus of true weevils in the subfamily Baridinae. There are six species. These weevils live in orchids, and are known generally as orchid weevils. They are native to Indonesia, the Philippines, and surrounding islands, and they can sometimes be found in shipments of cultivated orchids. Two species, Orchiophilus aterrimus and O. perigrinator, are pests of orchids that have become naturalized outside their native range.

Species:
Orchidophilus aterrimus
Orchidophilus epidendri
Orchidophilus eburifer
Orchidophilus insidiosus
Orchidophilus peregrinator
Orchidophilus ran

References 

Baridinae genera
Orchid ecology